İsmail Hakkı Duru is a Turkish theoretical physicist and emeritus professor of Mathematics at the Izmir Institute of Technology where he is former dean of the science faculty.

Publications
 Complete list at Google Scholar
 Complete list at SPIRES

References

External links

Turkish non-fiction writers
Turkish physicists
Living people
1946 births
Theoretical physicists